The New Zealand blind cricket team is the national blind cricket team of New Zealand. New Zealand blind cricket team participates in One Day Internationals and T20 Internationals. New Zealand team also participated in the inaugural Blind Cricket World Cup in 1998 and ended up as semifinalists.
In the inaugural Blind Cricket World Cup, the following cricketers of New Zealand blind cricket team went on to bag some awards.

(A) Best bowlers of the World Cup
 B1 (Totally Blind)	Kevin Murray (New Zealand)	5 for 240
(B) Best Player of the First World Cup - (Rs 5,000 each)
 B2 (Partially blind)	James Dunn (New Zealand)	332 runs and 5 wickets

Tournament history

40-over Blind Cricket World Cup 
 1998 Blind Cricket World Cup – Group stage
 2002 Blind Cricket World Cup – Did not participate
 2006 Blind Cricket World Cup – Did not participate
 2014 Blind Cricket World Cup – Group stage

Blind T20 World Cup 
 2012 Blind World T20 – Groupstage
 2017 Blind World T20 – Groupstage

References

External links 
 

Blind cricket teams
Men's national sports teams of New Zealand
Parasports in New Zealand